Peglio is a comune (municipality) in the Province of Pesaro and Urbino in the Italian region Marche, located about  west of Ancona and about  southwest of Pesaro.  

Peglio borders the following municipalities: Lunano, Sant'Angelo in Vado, Sassocorvaro Auditore, Urbania, Urbino.

References

External links
 Official website

Cities and towns in the Marche